Hope for All the World EP is the twelfth main studio release and second Christmas album by CCM trio Phillips, Craig and Dean. It was released on November 23, 2010. It was the group's first EP, however all songs from the EP were all later included in a full-length Christmas studio album released in 2013 with the same name, along with four brand new songs.

Reception

Singles
The first single from the EP, For All The World, has performed moderately successful on Christian radio charts, debuting at No. 13 on the INSPO chart and 28 the Billboard Christian Songs chart. It is currently at 17 on the Christian Songs chart, 16 on the Soft AC/INSPO chart, and 10 on the INSPO chart

Do You Hear What I Hear has also charted at No. 31 on the Billboard chart and 20 on the Soft AC/INSPO and received radio airplay, despite not being officially released as a single.

Track listing
"For All The World" (Kyle Wayne Lee, Michael Farren) – 3:57
"O Come All Ye Faithful" – 3:44
"Do You Hear What I Hear" – 4:24
"A Night of Hope" (Geron Davis, Dan Dean) – 3:49
"God Bless Us" (Scott Krippayne, Jeff Peabody) – 3:35
"Jingle Bells (Duck Mix)" – 1:45
Total Length: 19:54

2013 CD Release 
"Born Is The King (It's Christmas) (Scott Ligertwood, Matt Crocker) – 3:17
"Do You Hear What I Hear" – 4:24
"For All The World" (Kyle Wayne Lee, Michael Farren) – 3:57
"O Come All Ye Faithful" – 3:44
"God Rest Ye Merry Gentlemen/We Three Kings" – 3:28
"The First Noel" – 3:35
"God Bless Us" (Scott Krippayne, Jeff Peabody) – 3:35
Suddenly (Randy Phillips, Jimmy Fedd, Matthew West) – 5:04
"A Night of Hope" (Geron Davis, Dan Dean) – 3:49
"Jingle Bells (Duck Mix)" – 1:45
Total Length: 36:34

Credits 

Phillips Craig & Dean
 Randy Phillips – lead vocals (1-10), backing vocals
 Dan Dean – lead vocals (1-9), backing vocals
 Shawn Craig – lead vocals (2-8), backing vocals

Musicians
 Nathan Nockels – keyboards, programming, acoustic guitars, electric guitars
 Gabe Scott – programming, accordion, acoustic guitars, bouzouki, dulcimer
 Jason Hoard – electric guitars
 Chris Brink – bass
 Jacob Arnold – drums

Production
 Nathan Nockels – producer, recording 
 Jim Dineen – recording 
 Tom Laune – mixing 
 Dave McNair – mastering

Singles

References

2010 Christmas albums
Phillips, Craig and Dean albums
Christmas albums by American artists